Tamgha-e-Imtiaz also spelled as Tamgha-i-Imtiaz, is a state-organised honour of Pakistan. It is given to any civilian in Pakistan based on their achievements. While it is a civilian/military award, it can be bestowed upon officers of the Pakistan Armed Forces and worn on their uniform. It can also be awarded to foreign citizens who have performed great service to Pakistan.

Grades of the Order of Imtiaz 

This award is the 4th Grade in the Order of Imtiaz (Excellence). The four Grades in the Order of Imtiaz are:

 Nishan-e-Imtiaz (Order of Excellence)
 Hilal-e-Imtiaz (Crescent of Excellence) 
 Sitara-e-Imtiaz (Star of Excellence)
 Tamgha-e-Imtiaz (Medal of Excellence).

Service Ribbon Insignia 
The ribbon for the Tamgha-e-Imtiaz (Civilian) is:

 Yellow with a white centre band and a narrow Pakistan Green stripe in the middle.

The ribbon for the Tamgha-e-Imtiaz (Military) is:

 White edges with Pakistan Green centre band and three equal stripes in the middle, separated by two equal sized Pakistan Green stripes.

Recipients

2017

2019

2020

2021

See also 
 Civil decorations of Pakistan
 Hilal-i-Imtiaz

References

External links 
 2020 Tamgha e Imtiaz awards
 2021 Tamgha e Imtiaz awards

Civil awards and decorations of Pakistan
Military awards and decorations of Pakistan
Recipients of Tamgha-e-Imtiaz